The Défi sportif (sports challenge) is a multi-sport event for disabled athletes. The Défi sportif is unique in that it involves athletes of the five types of disabilities: auditory, physical, psychiatric, intellectual, and visual as well as athletes of all levels: from students, to up-and-coming athletes and Paralympic athletes from different countries participate. The Défi sportif is held every year in Montreal, Quebec, Canada. The main site is Montreal's Complexe sportif Claude-Robillard, but other sites in Montreal are used, such as Centre Pierre-Charbonneau, Collège de Maisonneuve, Mount Royal, Circuit Gilles Villeneuve, etc.

History
The first Défi sportif opened on April 19, 1984, under the auspices of the organization known as the Regional Association for the Recreation of Disabled Persons of the Island of Montreal. The inaugural Défi sportif welcomed no less than 720 athletes competing in 16 sports at three sites. In fact, it is the first time that associations representing all five types of disability gather to participate at one sporting event.

One of the events goals was to be self-financing. To that end the business community was approached and by the event's second year, numerous patrons, partners and sponsors lent their support and popular Quebec humorist Yvon Deschamps signed on as spokesman, a role he would play for the next fifteen years.

In 1986, the Défi sportif was named "Sporting Event of the Year" by the Montréal-Concordia Sports Commission.

The Défi sportif was originally a provincial event, but by 1989, more and more sports clubs from outside Quebec sent participants, and in the early 1990s, the Défi sportif went officially international with athletes Canada, the United States and France.
 
In 1998, the Défi sportif hosted athletes from eight countries, including Germany, France, Australia and Poland and was named the Quebec international sports event of the year.

In 2005, the Défi sportif welcomed some 2700 athletes over five days of competition. Its official spokespeople included wheelchair athlete Chantal Petitclerc.

In 2006, the Défi sportif welcomed some 2800 athletes over its run from April 26 to 30. Its official spokespeople once again included Petitclerc.

Games

Sports involved 
Competitions in the following sports are held at the Défi sportif:
 Badminton
 Ball hockey
 Boccia
 Cycling
 Goalball
 Rhythmic gymnastics
 Soccer
 Swimming
 Track and field
 Volleyball
 Water polo
 Wheelchair basketball
 Wheelchair fencing
 Wheelchair racing
 Wheelchair rugby

References

 Défi sportif

External links
 Défi sportif

Sport in Montreal
Multi-sport events in Canada
Recurring sporting events established in 1984